José Francisco "Francis" Ruiz (c. January 29, 1783 – January 19, 1840) was a Spanish soldier, educator, politician, Republic of Texas Senator, and revolutionary.

Early life
Ruiz was born in San Antonio de Bexar in the interior province of Spanish Texas, to Juan Manuel Ruiz and María Manuela de la Peña.

Career 
Appointed the first schoolmaster of San Antonio in 1803, he designated as the first school a house acquired by his father, on Military Plaza. This house was carefully reconstructed in 1943 and moved to the grounds of the Witte Museum, where it is still used for educational purposes.

In 1805, Ruiz became a member of the San Antonio City Council. He served in various official capacities including city attorney, or procurador.

Military
Ruiz began a long military career in Spain in 1813, fighting at the battle of Medina on August 18. Forced into exile from Texas until 1822, Ruiz returned after Mexico won its independence from Spain. He was ordered by the Mexican government to make attempts at peace with the hostile Native American tribes of the north, the Comanches and the Lipan Apaches. Appointed to the mounted militia upon his return, he successfully led a peace treaty delegation of Lipan Apache to Mexico City later in 1822. The next year, Ruiz received a promotion to army captain, unassigned, with the rank of lieutenant colonel, receiving confirmation of his commission in 1825. He was sent to Nacogdoches in December 1826 to help put down the Fredonian Rebellion, receiving command of that detachment in April 1827.

Ruiz was a member of the Comisión de Límites (Boundary Commission), which was assigned to explore areas of Texas following the Adams-Onís Treaty of 1819. This commission left Mexico City on November 10, 1827, under the command of General Manuel de Mier y Terán. Ruiz returned to Bexar in 1828, where he commanded the famed Second Flying Company of San Carlos de Parras, which established Fort Tenoxtitlán in 1830.

In the fall of 1828, Ruiz led the Mier y Teran group of 30 Mexican soldiers and commission members, including naturalist Jean-Louis Berlandier, on a bear and buffalo hunt on open lands northwest of San Antonio, with the cooperation of local Comanche leaders Reyuna and El Ronca. From November 19 to December 18, Ruiz and a military party explored the silver mines on the San Saba River. During this time, he wrote his Report on the Indian Tribes of Texas in 1828, preserved in the Rare Book and Manuscript Library at Yale University. An insight into the trust Ruiz garnered with the Indian tribes of Texas can be found in the Shawnee tribe's reference to him as "a good man no lie and a friend of the Indians."

Ruiz retired from the military at the end of 1832.

Politics
Ruiz allied himself with the Texas Revolution in 1835 and traveled to Washington-on-the-Brazos, Texas, in late February 1836, as a delegate to the Convention of 1836. On March 2, 1836, Ruiz along with his nephew José Antonio Navarro, signed the Texas Declaration of Independence, the only native Texans among the 59 men to sign this historic document.

During the revolution he was an outspoken supporter of independence, and he eloquently wrote to his family, "Under no circumstance take sides against the Texans, for only God will return the territory of Texas to the Mexican government."

Later life and family
Ruiz represented the Bexar district as its Senator in the 1st Congress of the Republic of Texas. He died in 1840 and was buried in San Antonio.

Ruiz's son Francisco Antonio Ruiz, San Antonio mayor or alcalde at the time, was an important eyewitness to the Battle of the Alamo, having been placed under house arrest at his San Antonio home by Antonio López de Santa Anna and later forced by the Mexican dictator to identify the bodies of the deceased after the battle.

References

Further reading

External links

 

 

Republic of Texas Senators
People of Spanish Texas
1783 births
1840 deaths
People from San Antonio
People of the Texas Revolution
1st Congress of the Republic of Texas
Tejano politicians
Signers of the Texas Declaration of Independence